NGV or ngv may refer to:

 Natural gas vehicle, an alternative fuel vehicle that uses compressed natural gas or liquefied natural gas
 National Gallery of Victoria, an art museum in Melbourne, Victoria, Australia
 ngv, the ISO 639-3 code for Nagumi language, Cameroon